The annaprashana, also known as annaprashana vidhi or annaprashanam, is a Hindu rite of passage (Saṃskāra) that marks an infant's first intake of food other than milk. The term annaprashana means 'eating of cooked rice'. In Vedic Hindu culture, the child cannot eat rice until the annaprashana has occurred. Importance is given to rice because of its symbolism as a life-sustaining food and a sacred food in the form of kheer. The annaprashana remains an important milestone and the ceremony is celebrated in Nepal and India. In Nepal, it is also called pasni.

Etymology
The word  is made of two Sanskrit words,  meaning 'cooked rice' and  meaning 'feeding'.

 The ceremony of annaprashana is referred to in English as grain initiation or rice-feeding ceremony.

Ceremony

The ceremony is a puja followed by the rice feeding. It is arranged in consultation with a priest who selects an auspicious date when the child is five to eight months old. Bengalis/Telugus believe that odd months are auspicious for baby girls (month 5 or 7) and even months (month 6 or 8) for baby boys.

The child is bathed, dressed in ceremonial attire, and placed on the parents lap, as prayers are offered to deities to bless the child with good digestive powers, good speech, and good mental development. This is then followed by the feeding of rice in the form of a sweet pudding called kheer that is considered a holy food in Hindu religious ceremonies. Ancient Hindu texts (Smriti) provide detailed instructions relating to the performance of this rite of passage (saṃskāra) including the type, quality, and quantity, and the cooking process for the solid food that the child should be fed. It is an occasion for celebration, and extended family, friends, and neighbors are invited to attend.

In Bengali Hindu culture, the annaprashana is an elaborate ceremony called the  'rice in the mouth' or  'maternal rice', where the child's maternal uncle or maternal grandfather feeds them rice. This takes place in the maternal uncle's home or maternal grandparents's home or as a grand occasion in a banquet hall, and the religious rites (puja) of the ceremony may be conducted by a priest at the same event or as a separate gathering before the larger event. For the rice feeding, babies are dressed in traditional headdress (topor) and a specific variety of food is prepared, including kheer and also five different types of fried foods and a fish dish. The kheer is customarily prepared by the baby's mother or grandmother and served in a vessel made of silver. Conch shells are blown and women in attendance will engage in Ululation to mark the holiness of the occasion, as the child's maternal uncle or maternal grandfather feeds them. The ceremony is followed by a game, where the baby is offered a banana leaf or silver plate which contains certain objects: a small amount of soil (symbolizing property), a book (symbolizing learning), a pen (symbolizing wisdom), and coins or money (symbolizing wealth). Traditional belief is that the object picked up by the baby represents a prominent highlight in their future. The baby's elder relatives and elder guests will then take turns to feed the child a small portion of kheer and offering their blessings by placing dhaan (rice seeds) and dubba (grass stalks) on the baby's head.

The baby is dressed in a traditional kasavu, placed on an uncle or parent's lap, then blessed with sandal paste, tulsi leaves, and flowers by the temple priest. A banana leaf plate with food, including rice or kheer and banana, is placed in front of the child from which the baby's uncle, father, or grandfather feeds him or her first. It can be tradition for the baby's father to dip a gold ring into each of the food items and then touch the ring to the baby's tongue. The rice feeding is followed by a lighthearted tulabhara where the weight of the child is taken to ensure it matches the weight of the family's offering to the temple and deities.

References

External links 
 Annaprashan Vidhi
 Annaprashana Puja
 Annaprashan
 HinduCulture
 Annaprashana Smaskara

  Annaprashan video

Samskaras